The 12793 / 12794 Rayalaseema Express is a daily overnight Superfast Express train belonging to Indian Railways, that used to run between Hyderabad and  but is now extended up to .

Service

The train was numbered 17429 for Hyderabad to Tirupati journey and 17430 for the return journey. After 1 November 2017, the train has been converted into a superfast train under "Mission Raftar" scheme of Indian Railways and extended up to Nizamabad with new numbers 12793 for Tirupati to Nizamabad journey and 12794 for the return.

Nomenclature

The train is named after the region of Rayalaseema in the state of Andhra Pradesh as it connects the Hindu pilgrimage center Tirupati with Nizamabad, and the Telangana state capital of Hyderabad covering all the four districts of Rayalaseema (Chittor, Kadapa, Anantapur and Kurnool) en route. Rayalaseema recently derailed at Sirnapally station 2 bogies of train derailed, no injuries to passengers reported.

Time Table

Traction

It is hauled by a Lallaguda-based WAP-7 electric locomotive from Tirupati till Secunderabad. From Secunderabad till Nizamabad it is hauled by a Gooty-based WDP-4D diesel locomotive and vice versa.

References

Transport in Tirupati
Transport in Hyderabad, India
Railway services introduced in 1977
Express trains in India
Rail transport in Andhra Pradesh
Rail transport in Telangana
Named passenger trains of India